Michael Christopher Sheen (born 5 February 1969) is a Welsh actor, television producer and political activist. After training at London's Royal Academy of Dramatic Art (RADA), he worked mainly in theatre throughout the 1990s with stage roles in Romeo and Juliet (1992), Don't Fool with Love (1993), Peer Gynt (1994), The Seagull (1995), The Homecoming (1997), and Henry V (1997). His performances in Amadeus at the Old Vic and Look Back in Anger at the National Theatre were nominated for Olivier Awards in 1998 and 1999, respectively. In 2003, he was nominated for a third Olivier Award for his performance in Caligula at the Donmar Warehouse.

Sheen has become better known as a screen actor since the 2000s, in particular through his roles in various biographical films. For writer Peter Morgan, he starred in a trilogy of films as UK prime minister Tony Blairthe television film The Deal in 2003, The Queen (2006), and The Special Relationship (2010)earning him nominations for both a BAFTA Award and an Emmy. He was also nominated for a BAFTA as the troubled comic actor Kenneth Williams in BBC Four's 2006 Fantabulosa!, and was nominated for a fourth Olivier Award in 2006 for portraying the broadcaster David Frost in Frost/Nixon, a role he revisited in the 2008 film adaptation of the play. He starred as the controversial football manager Brian Clough in The Damned United (2009).

Since 2009, Sheen has had a wider variety of roles. In 2009, he appeared in two fantasy films, Underworld: Rise of the Lycans and The Twilight Saga: New Moon, and in 2010, he made a four-episode guest appearance in the NBC comedy 30 Rock. He appeared in the science-fiction film Tron: Legacy (2010) and Woody Allen's romantic comedy Midnight in Paris (2011). He directed and starred in National Theatre Wales's The Passion. From late 2011 until early 2012, he played the title role in Hamlet at the Young Vic. He played a lead role in The Twilight Saga: Breaking Dawn Part 2 in 2012. In 2013, he received a Golden Globe nomination for his role in Showtime's television drama Masters of Sex.

Sheen played an incarcerated serial killer surgeon in Fox's drama series Prodigal Son (2019–2021), Aziraphale in the BBC/Amazon Studios fantasy comedy series Good Omens (2019–present), and appeared as Chris Tarrant in Quiz (2020). He played himself in the quarantine comedy show Staged (2020–2022) with Good Omens co-star David Tennant throughout the COVID-19 lockdown.

Sheen is politically engaged, and in 2017 he returned his OBE after conducting research on Wales's relationship with England.

Early life
Sheen was born on 5 February 1969 in Newport, Monmouthshire, Wales, the son of Irene, a secretary, and Meyrick, a British Steel Corporation personnel manager. He has one younger sister, Joanne. The family lived in Llanmartin, near Newport, for 12 years. When he was five, the family moved to Wallasey for work, but settled in his parents' home town of Port Talbot, Glamorgan, three years later.

Director Sam Mendes has described Sheen as "a stage creature" and attributed that to the actor's Welsh roots: "I'm serious. He's Welsh in the tradition of Anthony Hopkins and Richard Burton: fiery, mercurial, unpredictable." A keen footballer, Sheen was scouted and offered a place on Arsenal's youth team at the age of 12, but his family was unwilling to relocate to London. He later said he was "grateful" for his parents' decision, as the chances of forging a professional football career were "so slim".

Sheen was raised in a theatrical family, his parents both being involved in local amateur operatics and musicals and, later in life, his father worked as a part-time professional Jack Nicholson lookalike. In his teenage years, Sheen was involved with the West Glamorgan Youth Theatre and, later, the National Youth Theatre of Wales. "It was a brilliant youth theatre", Sheen has said, "and it taught me not only a lot about acting, but also about work ethic; it was very disciplined." He was influenced by the performances of Laurence Olivier and the writings of theatre critic Kenneth Tynan, saying "the combination of those two things kind of blew my head off." Sheen was educated at Blaenbaglan Primary School, Glan Afan Comprehensive School and, finally, Neath Port Talbot College where he sat A-levels in English, Drama and Sociology. He considered studying English at university but instead decided to attend drama school. He moved to London in 1988 to train as an actor at the Royal Academy of Dramatic Art (RADA), having spent the previous year working in a Welsh fast-food restaurant called Burger Master to earn money. Sheen was granted the Laurence Olivier Bursary by the Society of London Theatre in his second year at RADA. He graduated in 1991 with a BA in Acting.

Career

Classical stage roles (1991–2001)
Sheen worked predominantly in theatre in the 1990s and has since remarked that he will always feel "slightly more at home" on stage. "It's more of an actor's medium. You are your own editor, nobody else is choosing what is being seen of you." His first professional role, while still in his third and final year at RADA, was in When She Danced at the Globe Theatre in 1991. He later described the role as "a big break. One day, I was at RADA doing a movement class, the next I was at a read-through with Vanessa Redgrave and Frances de la Tour." Milton Shulman of the Evening Standard praised an "excellent" performance while The Observer wrote of "a notable West End debut". In 1992, Sheen's performance in Romeo and Juliet at the Royal Exchange received a MEN Theatre Award nomination and led theatre critic Michael Coveney to declare him "the most exciting young actor of his generation ... a volatile, electrifying and technically fearless performer". His 1993 turn as Perdican in Alfred de Musset's Don't Fool With Love at the Donmar Warehouse was nominated for the Ian Charleson Award. and was described by The Independent as "quite thrilling". Also in 1993, Sheen appeared in the world premiere of Harold Pinter's Moonlight at the Almeida Theatre and made his television debut in the 1993 BBC mini-series Gallowglass.

Sheen played the title role in Peer Gynt in 1994. The Yukio Ninagawa production was staged in Oslo, Tokyo and at the Barbican Centre, London. The Times praised Sheen's "astonishing vitality" while The Independent found him "sensationally good" and noted that "the Norwegian press were grudgingly captivated by the mercurial Welsh boyo". In other 1994 work, Sheen appeared in Le Livre de Spencer at the Odéon-Théâtre de l'Europe, Paris and starred in the cross-dressing farce Charley's Aunt at the Royal Exchange. In 1995, he appeared opposite Kate Beckinsale in a production of The Seagull at the Theatre Royal, Bath and, with the encouragement of Thelma Holt, directed and starred in The Dresser at the Theatre Royal, Plymouth. In addition, Sheen made his film debut that year, appearing opposite Kenneth Branagh in Othello. 1996 saw Sheen at the National Theatre for The Ends of the Earth, an original play by David Lan. A minor role in Mary Reilly marked the first of three film collaborations with director Stephen Frears. Sheen's most significant appearance of 1997 was the title role in Henry V, staged by the Royal Shakespeare Company (RSC) at their Stratford-upon-Avon theatre, which earned him a second Ian Charleson Award nomination. The Times praised "a blisteringly intelligent performance". Also in 1997, he appeared in a revival of Harold Pinter's The Homecoming at the National Theatre, directed by Roger Michell, and directed Badfinger, starring Rhys Ifans, at the Donmar Warehouse. The latter was staged by the Thin Language Theatre Company, which Sheen had co-founded in 1991, aiming to further Welsh theatre. He then appeared in the biographical film Wilde, playing Robbie Ross to Stephen Fry's Oscar Wilde. In early 1998 Sheen formed a production company, The Foundry, with Helen McCrory and Robert Delamere to promote the work of emerging playwrights, and produced A Little World of Our Own at the Donmar Warehouse, which gave Colin Farrell his West End debut.

From 1998 to 1999, Sheen starred as Mozart in a successful revival of Amadeus. The Peter Hall-directed production was staged at the Old Vic, London, and later transferred to the Music Box on Broadway. Ben Brantley, chief theatre critic for The New York Times, was particularly vocal in his praise. He noted that "Mr. Sheen elicits a real poetry from the role" and felt that, while watching him, "you start to appreciate the derivation of the term star. This actor is so luminous it's scary!" The Independent found him "quite stunning as Mozart. His fantastically physical performance convinces you of his character's genius and the play catches fire whenever he's on stage." Sheen was nominated for a Laurence Olivier Award for Best Supporting Performance and an Outer Critics Circle Award for Outstanding Actor. In 1999, Sheen explored the role of Jimmy Porter in the National Theatre's production of Look Back in Anger. In 2003, Sheen described the production as "the most enjoyable thing I've ever done ... everything came together". "Sheen has cornered the market in explosive energy", said The Independent, "but this thrilling performance is his finest yet." The Financial Times noted: "As Jimmy Porter, a role of staggering difficulty in every way, Michael Sheen gives surely the best performance London has yet seen from him ... You hang on every word he utters ... This is a dazzlingly through-the-body performance." He was nominated for a Laurence Olivier Award for Best Actor and an Evening Standard Award for Best Actor.

The Deal, The Queen, and Fantabulosa (2002–2006)
At this point in his career, Sheen began to devote more time to film work. Heartlands, a little-seen 2002 film about a naive man's road trip in the Midlands, was his first leading film role. While The Guardian dismissed the "cloying bittersweet-regional-lottery-Britfilm", it noted that "Sheen himself has a childlike, Frank Spencer-ish charm". "It was great to do something that was so different", Sheen has said of the role. "I usually play very extreme characters." Also in 2002, he had a minor role in the action-adventure film The Four Feathers. In 2003, Sheen appeared in Bright Young Things, the directorial debut of his Wilde co-star, Stephen Fry. An adaptation of Evelyn Waugh's novel Vile Bodies, the film followed high society partygoers in decadent, pre-war London. Sheen played a gay aristocrat in an ensemble cast which included James McAvoy, Emily Mortimer, David Tennant, Dan Aykroyd, Jim Broadbent and Peter O'Toole. While the Los Angeles Times said he "shone", The Guardian felt the role "drastically under-uses his talents". Sheen described his character as "possibly the campest man in cinema history" and relished a scene "where I do drugs with [a then 95-year-old] Sir John Mills." In other 2003 film work, Sheen portrayed the werewolf leader Lucian in Underworld and made a brief appearance in the sci-fi film Timeline.

Sheen returned to the stage in 2003 to play the title role in Caligula at the Donmar Warehouse, directed by Michael Grandage. It was the first of just three stage appearances during the 2000s; his young daughter was now based in Los Angeles which made more frequent stage runs in Britain impractical. The Independents critic declared it "one of the most thrilling and searching performances I have ever witnessed" and The Daily Telegraph described him as an "outrageously charismatic actor" with "an astonishing physical presence". The Times praised a "riveting performance" and The Guardian found him "highly impressive ... at one point he attacks his court poet with a single hair-raising leap across a chair and table". Sheen won an Evening Standard Award for Best Actor and a Critics' Circle Theatre Award for Best Actor, and was again nominated for a Laurence Olivier Award for Best Actor.

Sheen's breakthrough role was as British politician Tony Blair in 2003's The Deal. The Channel 4 film explored the so-called Granita pact made by Tony Blair and Gordon Brown prior to the 1994 Labour Party leadership election, and was the actor's first collaboration with screenwriter Peter Morgan. Director Stephen Frears cast him because "he was in Mary Reilly and I knew he was brilliant." Filmed while he was playing Caligula nightly on stage, Sheen has remarked, "It's interesting that in searching for monsters to play, you often end up playing leaders." The Daily Telegraph praised his "earnest, yet steely, portrayal" while The Guardian found him "excellent. This is intelligent and honest casting." In 2004, Sheen starred in ITV's Dirty Filthy Love, a comic film about a man dealing with OCD and Tourette's after a marital separation. Sheen spoke of "treading a fine line" because "a lot of the symptoms are intrinsically comical". He was nominated for a BAFTA Award for Best Television Actor and a RTS Best Actor Award. Also in 2004, Sheen played a pompous rock star in the romantic comedy Laws of Attraction and produced and starred in The Banker, which won a BAFTA Award for Best Short Film. 

In 2005, Sheen starred in the National Theatre's production of The UN Inspector, a David Farr adaptation of The Government Inspector. The Times wrote of "a scathingly brilliant and inventive performance" while Variety noted that the actor "adds comic finesse to his apparently ceaseless repertoire". The Evening Standard, while conceding that the performance was "technically brilliant", expressed bemusement as to why "one of the most mercurial and inspiring actors we have seems set on impersonating Rik Mayall throughout". Also that year, he took part in the Old Vic's 24 Hour Play, in which The Daily Telegraph felt he "dazzled". In 2005 film work, Sheen starred in Dead Long Enough, a small-budget Welsh/Irish film, with his longtime friend, Jason Hughes. In addition, he had a supporting role in Ridley Scott's Kingdom of Heaven, made a cameo appearance in The League of Gentlemen's Apocalypse and starred in the short film The Open Doors.

Sheen came to international attention in 2006 for his portrayal of Tony Blair in The Queen. The film focused on the differing reactions of the British Royal Family and the newly appointed Prime Minister following the death of Diana, Princess of Wales in 1997; it was Sheen's third collaboration with director Stephen Frears and his second with screenwriter Peter Morgan. He enjoyed reprising his role because Blair, at this point in his career, had "a weight to him that he didn't have before". When asked to discuss his personal opinion of Blair, Sheen admitted that the more time he spent working on the character, the "less opinion" he has of the politician: "Now when I watch him on TV or hear his voice, it's sort of like a cross between a family member, a friend and seeing a really old embarrassing video of yourself." Peter Travers of Rolling Stone praised "a sensational performance, alert and nuanced" while Empire spoke of an "uncanny, insightful performance". Sheen was nominated for a BAFTA Award for Best Actor in a Supporting Role. His second film appearance of 2006 was a supporting role in Blood Diamond as an unscrupulous diamond dealer. Also in 2006, Sheen starred as the troubled English comic actor Kenneth Williams in BBC Four's Fantabulosa! In preparation for the role, he lost two and a half stone (approx. 35 lbs), studied archival footage and read Williams' published diaries. Sheen has said he is "fascinated by finding the private side of the public face". The Times found his performance "mesmerising" while The Observer described it as "a characterisation for which the description tour-de-force is, frankly, pretty faint praise". He won a RTS Award for Best Actor, and received his second BAFTA nomination of 2006, for Best Television Actor. Sheen starred in two other BBC television productions in 2006, playing H. G. Wells in H. G. Wells: War with the World and Nero in Ancient Rome: The Rise and Fall of an Empire.

Frost/Nixon and The Damned United (2007–2009)
From 2006 to 2007, Sheen starred as the television broadcaster David Frost in Frost/Nixon at both the Donmar Warehouse and Gielgud Theatre in London and at the Jacobs Theatre on Broadway. The play, written by Peter Morgan, directed by Michael Grandage and co-starring Frank Langella, was a critical and commercial success but Sheen initially accepted the role as a favour to his friends and "never thought it was going anywhere". The Guardian said the actor "exactly captures Frost's verbal tics and mannerisms while suggesting a nervousness behind the self-assurance". "He's got the voice, the mannerisms, the blaze," said the Financial Times, "but, more than that, Sheen – as viscerally exciting an actor as any in Britain today – shows us the hunger of Frost's ambition .. and fox-like instinct for the hunt and the kill." Sheen was nominated for a Laurence Olivier Award for Best Actor and a Drama League Award for Distinguished Performance. Sheen next appeared in the 2007 film Music Within as a political activist with cerebral palsy. He spoke of having a "responsibility" to accurately portray the condition. Variety said his performance was "remarkable.. utterly convincing", USA Today found him "outstanding" while the Los Angeles Times felt he was "reminiscent of Daniel Day-Lewis in My Left Foot, bringing a vibrancy and wit to the role". Also that year, Sheen starred in the short film Airlock, or How To Say Goodbye in Space with Derek Jacobi and was invited to join the actors' branch of the Academy of Motion Picture Arts & Sciences.

Sheen reprised the role of David Frost in 2008's Frost/Nixon, a film dramatisation of The Nixon Interviews of 1977. Despite appearing in the original stage production in a part written for him by Peter Morgan, Sheen was surprised to have been cast in the film: "Peter said he'd only be prepared to give the rights to someone who would cast me as Frost, which was very nice, but when the studios get their hands on something... Right up until we started filming I was prepared to be disappointed". Roger Ebert of the Chicago Sun-Times asserted that Sheen embodied his character in a "compelling, intense" performance while The Wall Street Journal felt he was "a brilliant actor" who "grows his character from a bright-eyed social butterfly to a gimlet-eyed interrogator". However, The New York Times felt "the likable, watchable Mr. Sheen has been pitted against a scene-stealer" in Frank Langella's Nixon. Frost himself later said it was "a wonderful performance". Sheen was the recipient of the Variety Award at the British Independent Film Awards 2008., while Langella was nominated for an Academy Award.

In 2009, portrayed another public figure; he starred in The Damned United as the outspoken football manager Brian Clough. The Tom Hooper-directed film focused on Clough's disastrous 44-day tenure as manager of Leeds United and marked Sheen's fifth collaboration with writer Peter Morgan. He said Clough is the real-life character he enjoyed playing most. The Guardian, writing in 2009, declared it the "best performance of his big-screen career" while The Times found him "magnificent". Entertainment Weekly asserted that, despite American audiences' unfamiliarity with Clough, "what's lost in translation is recovered easily enough in Michael Sheen's astonishing performance". Variety noted that his "typically scrupulous channelling of Clough gets the tics and mannerisms right, but also carves a moving portrait of a braggart suddenly out of his depth". Also in 2009, Sheen reprised his role as a werewolf in Underworld: Rise of the Lycans, a prequel to the original film. Of his decision to take part, Sheen has said: "My rule of thumb is that I want to do things I'd like to go and see myself." The New York Times felt he was "the movie's greatest asset ... [taking] a lively break from his usual high-crust duties to bring wit, actual acting and some unexpected musculature to the goth-horror flick". Variety said he hit "all the right notes in a star-powered performance that will amuse, if not amaze, anyone who only knows the actor as Tony Blair or David Frost" while Richard Corliss of Time noted that he "tries bravely to keep a straight face"

Sheen had a supporting role in 2009's The Twilight Saga: New Moon, the second film in the highly popular vampire series. In its review, Rolling Stone said: "Late in the film, a real actor, Michael Sheen, shows up as the mind-reading Aro, of the Italian Volturi vampires, and sparks things up. You can almost hear the young cast thinking, 'Is that acting? It looks hard.' So Sheen is quickly ushered out." While The New York Times said he "preens with plausible menace", USA Today felt he "plays the character with more high-pitched giddiness than menace". He was named Actor of the Year at GQ magazine's annual Men of the Year ceremony. Sheen made two one-off stage appearances in 2009; he performed a scene from Betrayal as part of a Harold Pinter tribute evening at the National Theatre and performed improvisational comedy as part of The Groundlings' Crazy Joe Show in Los Angeles.

Hamlet and Masters of Sex (2010–2018)
In 2010, Sheen had a supporting role in the science fiction sequel Tron: Legacy. Referring to his David Bowie-esque character, Sheen has said, "I was paid to show off basically". The Wall Street Journal found little fun in the movie "except for a gleefully campy turn by Michael Sheen" while The New York Times said he "shows up to deliver the closest thing to a performance in the movie". The Daily Telegraph felt his "lively hamming as a cane-swishing nightclub owner merely underlines how impersonal—how inhuman—much else here is". However, USA Today felt his "scenery-chewing performance ... is meant as comic relief, but this movie thunders along so seriously that the attempt at humor feels jarring". In other 2010 film work, Sheen voiced Nivens McTwisp, the White Rabbit, in Tim Burton's Alice in Wonderland and Dr. Griffiths in Disney's Tinker Bell and the Great Fairy Rescue and appeared as a terrorist in Unthinkable. On television, Sheen's performance in the third instalment of Peter Morgan's Blair trilogy, The Special Relationship, was nominated for an Emmy Award for Outstanding Lead Actor – Miniseries or Movie. The HBO film examined the "special relationship" between the US and the UK in the political era of Blair and Bill Clinton. It was the sixth collaboration between Sheen and Peter Morgan; both parties have since said they will not work together again "for the foreseeable future". Sheen also made a guest appearance in four episodes of NBC's 30 Rock as Wesley Snipes, a love interest for Tina Fey's Liz Lemon. Fey, the sitcom's star and creator, has said that "he was so funny and delightful to work with". In November 2010, Sheen received the BAFTA Britannia Award for British Artist of the Year.

In 2011, Sheen starred in and was creative director of National Theatre Wales's The Passion, a 72-hour secular passion play staged in his hometown of Port Talbot, Wales. In addition to a professional cast, over one thousand local amateurs took part in the performance and as many more volunteers from local charity and community groups were involved in preparations in the months leading up to the play. The event was the subject of both a BBC documentary and The Gospel of Us, a film by director Dave McKean. Sheen has described it as "the most meaningful experience" of his career. The Observer declared it "one of the outstanding theatrical events not only of this year, but of the decade". The Independents critic described it as "the most extraordinary piece of community-specific theatre I've ever beheld". While The Daily Telegraph bemoaned the large-scale production's logistical problems, "overall I found it touching, transformative and, in its own wayward way, a triumph." The Guardian felt it was "so much more than just an epic piece of street theatre..transforming and uplifting". Sheen and co-director Bill Mitchell were jointly honoured as Best Director at the Theatre Awards UK 2011. In 2013, Sheen was nominated for a Best Actor Welsh BAFTA for The Gospel of Us.

Sheen's most notable film appearance of 2011 was a supporting role in Woody Allen's Midnight in Paris. Allen noted that "Michael had to do the pseudo-intellectual, the genuine intellectual, the pedant, and he came in and nailed it from the start". Sheen enjoyed playing "someone who's just absolutely got no sense that he's overstepping the mark or that he's being a bore." The film opened the 2011 Cannes Film Festival and became Allen's highest-grossing film to date. Also in 2011, Sheen starred in Beautiful Boy, an independent drama focusing on the aftermath of a school shooting, voiced the enigmatic and mysterious villain House in the Doctor Who episode "The Doctor's Wife" written by his friend Neil Gaiman and made cameo appearances in The Twilight Saga: Breaking Dawn – Part 1 and Resistance. In 2012 film work, Sheen starred opposite Toni Collette in the independent comedy Jesus Henry Christ and reprised his role as the vampire Aro in the final instalment of The Twilight Saga.

Sheen played the title role in Hamlet at the Young Vic in late 2011 and early 2012, a role he first explored in a 1999 BBC Radio 3 production. While there had been tentative plans over the years for both Peter Hall and Michael Grandage to direct Sheen in the play, he eventually asked Ian Rickson. Rickson's production was set in the secure wing of a psychiatric hospital and featured original music by PJ Harvey. The Evening Standard declared Sheen's performance "an audacious achievement" that "will live in the memory" while The Independent praised "a recklessly brilliant and bravura performance." The Daily Telegraph felt that Sheen "could be right up there among the great Hamlets", were it not for Rickson's "mindlessly modish" staging, while The Times found him "unbearably moving". The Guardian described him as "fascinating to watch ... intelligent, inventive and full of insights ... [he] delivers the "What a piece of work is a man" passage with a beautiful consciousness of human potential." The Observer declared him an actor "always worth crossing a principality to see and hear" whose To be, or not to be' is a marvel."

In 2013, Sheen appeared in a supporting role as the boyfriend of Tina Fey in the comedy Admission, with Stephanie Zacharek of The Village Voice describing the character as "a whiskery, elfin academic who chuckles to himself as he reads the Canterbury Tales prologue aloud in bed, in Middle English, no less. (Sheen is scarily good at this.)" In 2014, he starred in the fantasy children's film Mariah Mundi and the Midas Box. R. Kurt Osenlund of Slant Magazine said "the ever-versatile Sheen brings an artful hamminess to his role" but Matt Pais of RedEye found him "insufficiently zany" in "a part that Robert Downey Jr. would nail but never accept." His second film role of 2014 was a minor role in the political thriller Kill the Messenger. Also in 2014, he starred in IFC's six-episode The Spoils of Babylon, a television parody of classic, sweeping miniseries, in which he played the husband of Kristen Wiig's character.

In 2015, Sheen starred opposite Carey Mulligan in the romantic drama Far from the Madding Crowd as prosperous bachelor William Boldwood. His performance was well received. Anthony Lane of The New Yorker remarked: "How you prevent such a fellow, crushed by his own decency, from sagging into a bearded Ashley Wilkes is no easy task, yet Sheen succeeds, and Boldwood's brave smile grows dreadful to behold."<ref>{{cite magazine |url=https://www.newyorker.com/magazine/2015/05/04/fighting-on |title=Fighting On: Avengers: Age of Ultron and Far from the Madding Crowd"|magazine=The New Yorker|date=4 May 2015 |access-date=16 October 2016 |first=Anthony|last=Lane|author-link=Anthony Lane|archive-date=1 August 2016 |archive-url=https://web.archive.org/web/20160801093201/http://www.newyorker.com/magazine/2015/05/04/fighting-on |url-status=live }}</ref> Ignatiy Vishnevetsky of The A.V. Club found the character "pitiful, and sometimes downright painful to watch. He's not Hardy's Boldwood, but he's a Boldwood. The only sad, genuine moment of the film belongs to him." Peter Bradshaw of The Guardian remarked that Sheen's face "is etched with agony and an awful kind of abject adoration, forever trying to find ways to forgive the loved one in advance for rejection. When Sheen's Boldwood confides to Oak that he feels "grief" you really can feel his pain." Stephanie Zacharek of The Village Voice also referred to the scene where Boldwood expressed his grief, commenting: "Sheen's performance is fine-grained, and the pure Englishness of his understatement is heartrending." Also in 2015, Sheen had well-received comedic television performances in Comedy Bang! Bang!, The Spoils Before Dying and 7 Days in Hell. Mary McNamara of the Los Angeles Times said his television host in 7 Days in Hell was "played with damp lechery and cigarette-ash mastery." Liz Shannon Miller of Indiewire said he may have "stolen the show" while John DeFore of The Hollywood Reporter described him as the "scene-stealer of the bunch".

Between 2013 and 2016, Sheen starred in and produced Showtime's Masters of Sex. He and Lizzy Caplan portrayed the 1960s human sexuality pioneers Masters and Johnson; the series chronicled "their unusual lives, romance and pop culture trajectory, which saw them go from a Midwestern teaching hospital to the cover of Time magazine and Johnny Carson's couch". David Sims of The Atlantic described Sheen's portrayal of Masters as "an intensely honest and unsympathetic one" while Sonia Saraiya of The A.V. Club said Sheen played the role "so seamlessly it's hard to remember that there's a British actor there who has played flamboyant news personalities and prime ministers." Sean T. Collins of The Observer described Masters as "a singularly unappealing figure": "It's not that Michael Sheen is bad in the role. On the contrary! Sheen's skill in playing Masters as an asshole who oscillates between headache-inducing self-repression and volcanic rage renders him unpleasant to spend more than two minutes with at a time." Tim Goodman of The Hollywood Reporter remarked: "Masters has never been very likable. In fact, it's a testament to Sheen's performance— and Caplan's nuanced Johnson offsetting Masters—that anyone still cares what happens to Masters on a personal level." He received a Golden Globe nomination for his performance in late 2013.

In 2016, Sheen had supporting roles in the dramas Nocturnal Animals and Norman: The Moderate Rise and Tragic Fall of a New York Fixer, and the science fiction romance Passengers. He also reprised his role as the White Rabbit in the fantasy adventure Alice Through the Looking Glass. In 2017, he had supporting roles in the dramatic comedies Brad's Status and Home Again. In 2018, Sheen was cast as unconventional lawyer Roland Blum in season 3 of television series The Good Fight.

Good Omens and Staged (2019–present)
In May 2019 Sheen starred alongside David Tennant in Good Omens, based on the novel of the same name written by Terry Pratchett and Neil Gaiman and was cast as Chris Tarrant in the TV adaptation of James Graham's stage play Quiz. In September 2019, Sheen began playing the role of Martin Whitly in the American television series Prodigal Son on Fox. In April 2020, Quiz was shown on ITV. On 14 April, when the channel broadcast the second instalment, the continuity announcer introduced him as "Martin Sheen", a different actor. Sheen reacted to this by changing his Twitter handle to "Martin Sheen". In June 2020, Sheen starred alongside David Tennant again in a six-part television lockdown comedy entitled Staged, which was made using video-conferencing software. A second eight-episode series started airing in January 2021. In June 2021, Sheen returned to the London stage, after its protracted period of Covid-19 shutdown, in Dylan Thomas's Under Milk Wood in the Olivier Theatre at the National Theatre. A new production of Amadeus, scheduled for December 2022 at the Sydney Opera House, was announced in July 2022 with Sheen as Salieri. Continuing Sheen's professional partnership with Tennant, a third six-episode series of Staged aired in its entirely on 14 November 2022, while a second six-episode series of Good Omens will premiere in summer 2023.

Charity work
Sheen is the honorary President of Wales Council for Voluntary Action, the lead national body for the voluntary sector in Wales. Accepting the role he explained "I plan to use my role to actively challenge and support WCVA in their impact and role in supporting the community and keeping us focused on what matters locally as well as the need for national leadership". He is also an ambassador for TREAT Trust Wales, and is the Welsh ambassador of Into Film, a charity which offers after-school film clubs to state primary and secondary schools in an effort to improve literacy levels. He is also an ambassador of the environmental charity Keep Wales Tidy. 

Sheen is a patron of British charities including Scene & Heard, NSPCC's Child's Voice Appeal, Healing the Wounds, The Relationships Centre, WGCADA (West Glamorgan Council on Alcohol and Drug Abuse) and Adferiad Recovery, a new organisation providing support for vulnerable people in Wales and their families and carers. He has taken part in a number of charity football matches, including captaining the winning Soccer Aid 2010 team at Wembley Stadium, as well as appearing in the 2012 and 2014 matches. He is a patron of the British Independent Film Awards, an ambassador for the Dylan Thomas Prize and vice-president of Port Talbot Town F.C.
In October 2018, Sheen sponsored a women's football team in Wales.

In 2014, Sheen designed a Shakespeare-themed Paddington Bear statue. Placed outside Shakespeare's Globe, it was one of fifty statues of Paddington located around London prior to the release of the film Paddington, which were auctioned to raise funds for the NSPCC. In 2017 Sheen founded the End High Cost Credit Alliance working to promote more affordable ways to borrow money. That same year Sheen became a Patron of Social Enterprise UK, a charity which supports social projects which benefit local, environmental and co-operative causes. In October 2018 Sheen and Natasha Kaplinsky became vice-presidents (an ambassadorial role) of the Royal Society for Public Health (RSPH). Sheen is a fundraising partner with the non-profit organization, The White Curl, which supports Welsh charities. In December 2021, Sheen announced that he would be giving all of his future earnings to charities, declaring himself a "not-for-profit actor".

 Political activism 
Sheen has done much political work, from campaigning to end high-cost credit agreements to trying to help find a solution to the crisis in local journalism.

He has also highlighted the importance of having a "healthy discussion" about Welsh independence. In 2020 Sheen received much media attention after revealing that he returned the OBE in 2017 in order to "avoid being a hypocrite" following a speech citing "past wrongs" committed by England "to fracture us, to control us, to subdue us".

On the "Prince of Wales" title, Sheen said the following:
When that change and the traditional requirements would mean the Prince of Wales would become a new person, and a new Englishman, it would be I think a really meaningful and powerful gesture for that title to no longer be held in the same way as it has before. That would be an incredibly meaningful thing I think to happen. Make a break there. Put some things that have been wrongs of the past right. There's an opportunity to do that at that point. Don't necessarily just because of habit and without thinking just carry on that tradition that was started as a humiliation to our country. That’s what it was. It was a humiliation. Why not change that when we come to this moment where inevitably things will change anyway?

Personal life
Sheen was in a relationship with English actress Kate Beckinsale from 1995 until 2003. They met when cast in a touring production of The Seagull in early 1995, and began living together shortly afterwards. Their daughter was born in 1999 in London. Their relationship ended in January 2003, soon after the couple moved to Los Angeles. Beckinsale had persuaded director Len Wiseman to cast Sheen in Underworld; but while on set, she and Wiseman fell in love, and subsequently married in 2004.

Sheen had a long-distance relationship with English ballet dancer Lorraine Stewart from late 2004 until mid-2010. He dated Canadian actress Rachel McAdams from autumn 2010 to early 2013. He dated American comedian Sarah Silverman from early 2014 to early 2018.

Sheen lives in Baglan, Wales with his girlfriend, Swedish actress Anna Lundberg. The couple have two daughters together, born September 2019 and May 2022.

Awards and recognition

Theatre awards
 M.E.N. Theatre Award for Best Actor (1992)—nominated for Romeo and Juliet at the Royal Exchange, Manchester
 Ian Charleson Award (1993)—nominated for Don't Fool with Love at the Donmar Warehouse, London
 Ian Charleson Award (1997)—nominated for Henry V at the Royal Shakespeare Theatre, Stratford Upon Avon
 Laurence Olivier Award for Best Supporting Performance (1998)—nominated for Amadeus at the Old Vic, London
 Outer Critics Circle Award for Outstanding Actor (1999)—nominated for Amadeus at the Music Box Theatre, Broadway
 Laurence Olivier Award for Best Actor (1999)—nominated for Look Back in Anger at the National Theatre, Chandigarh
 Evening Standard Award for Best Actor (1999)—nominated for Look Back in Anger at the National Theatre, London
 Evening Standard Award for Best Actor (2003)—win for Caligula at the Donmar Warehouse, London
 Critics' Circle Theatre Award for Best Actor (2003)—win for Caligula at the Donmar Warehouse, London
 Laurence Olivier Award for Best Actor (2003)—nominated for Caligula at the Donmar Warehouse, London
 Laurence Olivier Award for Best Actor (2006)—nominated for Frost/Nixon at the Donmar Warehouse, London
 Drama League Award for Distinguished Performance (2007)—nominated for Frost/Nixon at the Bernard B. Jacobs Theatre, Broadway
 Theatre Award UK for Best Director (2011)—win for The Passion, a site-specific performance in Port Talbot, Wales

Screen awards
 British Academy Television Award for Best Actor (2004)—nominated for Dirty Filthy Love Royal Television Society Award for Best Actor (2004)—nominated for Dirty Filthy Love British Academy Television Award for Best Actor (2006)—nominated for Fantabulosa! Royal Television Society Award for Best Actor (2006)—win for Fantabulosa! BAFTA Award for Best Actor in a Supporting Role (2006)—nominated for The Queen Chicago Film Critics Association Award for Best Supporting Actor (2006)—nominated for The Queen Los Angeles Film Critics Association Award for Best Supporting Actor (2006)—win for The Queen New York Film Critics Online (2006)—win for The Queen Kansas City Film Critics Circle Award for Best Supporting Actor (2006)—win for The Queen Toronto Film Critics Association Award for Best Supporting Actor (2006)—win for The Queen St. Louis Gateway Film Critics Association Award for Best Supporting Actor (2007)—nominated for The Music Within Evening Standard British Film Award for Best Actor (2008)—nominated for Frost/Nixon London Film Critics Circle Award for British Actor of the Year (2008)—nominated for Frost/Nixon Screen Actors Guild Award for Outstanding Performance by a Cast in a Motion Picture (2008)—nominated for Frost/Nixon Variety Award at the British Independent Film Awards 2008—win
 GQ Magazine's Actor of the Year (2009)—win
 Satellite Award for Best Actor – Motion Picture (2009)—nominated for The Damned United Emmy Award for Outstanding Lead Actor – Miniseries or a Movie (2010)—nominated for The Special Relationship BAFTA Britannia Award for British Artist of the Year (2010)—win
 Screen Actors Guild Award for Outstanding Performance by a Cast in a Motion Picture (2012)—nominated for Midnight in Paris Welsh BAFTA Award for Best Actor (2013)—nominated for The Gospel of UsReturn of OBE
Sheen was appointed Officer of the Order of the British Empire (OBE) in the 2009 New Year Honours for his services to drama. In 2020, Sheen revealed, during an online interview with Owen Jones, that he had "handed back" the medal after doing research for a lecture on the relationship between Wales and the British state, saying "I didn't mean any disrespect but I just realised I'd be a hypocrite if I said the things I was going to say in the lecture about the nature of the relationship between Wales and the British state." Individuals who voluntarily renounce an honour continue to legally hold it unless it is annulled by the monarch.

Other honours
He was awarded the freedom of the borough of Neath Port Talbot, Wales in 2008 for his services in the field of the dramatic arts. He is an Honorary Fellow of the University of Wales, Newport, the Royal Welsh College of Music & Drama, Swansea University, Aberystwyth University and Swansea Metropolitan University, and has been awarded the James Joyce Award by University College Dublin.

List of performances

In addition to theatre, film and television credits, Sheen has also appeared in many radio productions, particularly in the early years of his career. Notable radio play appearances include Strangers on a Train (1994) opposite Bill Nighy, The Importance of Being Earnest (1995) opposite Judi Dench, Romeo and Juliet (1997) opposite Kate Beckinsale, Troy (1998) and The Pretenders (2004) both opposite Paul Scofield. He has narrated five novels for BBC Radio 4 and Naxos AudioBooks: Crime and Punishment (1994), The Idiot (1995), The Picture of Dorian Gray (1995), A White Merc With Fins (1997), Salmon Fishing in the Yemen (2011) and The Ocean at the End of the Lane'' (2013).

References

External links

 
 
 
 
 
 
 
 Q&A: Michael Sheen
 Comprehensive career Q&A on theartsdesk.com

1969 births
20th-century Welsh male actors
21st-century Welsh male actors
Alumni of RADA
British expatriates in the United States
Critics' Circle Theatre Award winners
Living people
National Society for the Prevention of Cruelty to Children people
Officers of the Order of the British Empire
People educated at Glan Afan Comprehensive School
People from Newport, Wales
Welsh male film actors
Welsh male Shakespearean actors
Welsh male stage actors
Welsh male radio actors
Welsh male television actors
Welsh male voice actors
Welsh nationalists
Welsh television producers